Oh Well is the fourth studio album by American indie-folk group Insomniac Folklore. It was recorded by Tyler Hentschel at PMC Studio in Portland, Oregon, during the Spring of 2007 and released by Quiver Society on June 5, 2007. This is a transitional album that further explores folk music and Vaudeville. Only 1,000 copies of this album were pressed during Quiver Societies initial release.

A re-issue of Oh Well was released on Art vs Product in October 2012.

Track listing

Personnel 

 Insomniac Folklore
 Tyler Hentschel – Vocals, Guitar, Organ, Banjo, Accordion, Drums, lyricist, composer, songwriter
 John David Van Beek – Violin, Slide Guitar, Accordion, Mandolin
 Brian Flechtner – Drums
 Leon Goodenough – Guitar
 Bree Bizell – Backing Vocals
 Britta Cooper – Backing Vocals
 Tim Westcott – Synth

References 

2007 albums
Insomniac Folklore albums